Murdering Hell's Happy Cretins is the tenth studio album by experimental rock composer Zoogz Rift, released in 1988 by SST Records.

Track listing

Personnel 
Adapted from the Murdering Hell's Happy Cretins liner notes.
 Zoogz Rift – vocals, guitar, production, illustrations

Musicians
 Tom Brown – drums (side Two)
 Richie Hass – drums (side One), vibraphone (side Two)
 Toby Holmes – trombone
 Rocky Howard – accordion
 Willie Lapin – bass guitar
 John Trubee – guitar (side One)

Production and additional personnel
 Pieter Bruegel – illustrations
 Theo Van Eenbergen – recording (A1-A8)
 John Golden – mastering
 Steve Greeno – photography
 Marc Mylar – recording (B1-B5)

Release history

References

External links 
 Murdering Hell's Happy Cretins at iTunes
 

1988 albums
SST Records albums
Zoogz Rift albums